Giarola is a surname. Notable people with the surname include:

Antonio Giarola (1590s–1665), Italian painter
Giovanni Giarola (1518–1557), Italian painter 

Italian-language surnames